The 1934 United States Senate elections in Arizona took place on November 3, 1934. Incumbent Democratic U.S. Senator Henry F. Ashurst ran for reelection to a fifth term, defeating Republican nominee Joseph Edward Thompson in the general election by a wide margin.

Thompson's candidacy came at an inopportune time, as President Franklin D. Roosevelt had just begun his first term, and with the country in the midst of the Great Depression, the Democrats were far more popular than the Republicans at the time. Additionally, Ashurst, who had served continuously as U.S. Senator since Arizona joined the union in 1912, presented an even greater challenge to anyone who would have hoped to defeat him for reelection, due to his seniority, and Thompson was fairly unknown in state politics, having never served in government prior to running for U.S. Senate.

Ashurst notably faced opposition in the Democratic primary, however, from former Secretary of State Sidney P. Osborn, who later became Governor of Arizona for several terms. This would be Ashurst's final electoral success, as he would lose the Democratic primary in 1940 to Ernest McFarland.

Democratic primary

Candidates
 Henry F. Ashurst, incumbent U.S. Senator
 Sidney P. Osborn, former Secretary of State of Arizona
 Renz L. Jennings
 William Coxon, State Senator
 Charles H. Rutherford, candidate for U.S. Senate in 1926 and 1928

Results

Republican primary

Candidates
 Joseph Edward Thompson, businessman

General election

See also 
 United States Senate elections, 1934

References

1934
Arizona
United States Senate